Chris Conn (31 December 1937 – 12 February 2021) was a Grand Prix motorcycle road racer. He competed in the FIM motorcycle Grand Prix world championships from 1964 to 1967.

Motorcycle racing career
Conn was born in Portishead, Somerset. His best season was in 1966 when he finished the year in tenth place in the 500cc world championship. In 1966 he won the preseason invitational Mettet Grand Prix.

Conn died from a heart attack in Portishead on February 12, 2021.

References

1937 births
2021 deaths
People from Portishead, Somerset
English motorcycle racers
350cc World Championship riders
500cc World Championship riders
Isle of Man TT riders